Gayathri Mudigonda (born September 3, 1983, in India) is an Indian–Swedish actress.

Filmography 
2008: Bombay Dreams – Ebba

References

External links
Svensk Filmdatabas - Gayathri Mudigonda

Swedish actresses
Living people
1983 births